Ashby is an English surname. Notable people with the surname include: 

Aaron Ashby (born 1998), American baseball player
Alan Ashby (born 1951), American baseball player
Alexander Essebiensis (Alexander of Ashby) (c. 1220), English theologian and poet
Alison Marjorie Ashby (1901–1987), Australian botanical artist and plant collector
Andy Ashby (born 1967), American baseball player  
Carl Ashby (1914–2004), American artist
Christopher C. Ashby (born 1946), American ambassador to Uruguay, 1997–2001
David Ashby (born 1940), British Conservative Member of Parliament 1983–1997
David Ashby (cricketer) (1852–1934), New Zealand cricketer
Debee Ashby (born 1967), British adult model
Dorothy Ashby (1932–1986), American jazz harpist and composer
Earl Ashby (born 1921), Cuban baseball player
Edwin Ashby (1861–1941), Australian malacologist and ornithologist
Eric Ashby, Baron Ashby (1904–1992), British botanist and educator
Gary Ashby (born 1955), American baseball coach
George Ashby (martyr) (died 1537), martyred English monk
Hal Ashby (1929–1988), American film director
Harry Ashby (golfer) (1946–2010), English golfer
Irving Ashby (1920–1987), American jazz guitarist
Jeffrey Ashby (born 1954), American naval aviator and astronaut
John Ashby (militiaman) (18th century), colonel in the Virginia Militia
John Ashby (Royal Navy officer) (1646–1693), English admiral during the War of the League of Augsburg
Joseph Ashby-Sterry (c. 1837–1917), English poet and novelist
Linden Ashby (born 1960), American actor
Madeline Ashby (born 1983), American-Canadian science fiction writer
Margery Corbett Ashby (1882–1981), British feminist and internationalist
Michael Ashby (1914–2004), British neurologist
Michael F. Ashby (born 1935), British metallurgist
Peter Ashby, British musician and composer
Ray Ashby, British rugby player
Richard Ashby (born 1972), British poker player
Sydney Francis Ashby (1874–1954), British mycologist and phytopathologist
Sylvia Rose Ashby (born 1908), British-born Australian market researcher
Thomas Ashby (1874–1931), British archaeologist and architectural historian of ancient Rome
Turner Ashby (1828–1862), Confederate cavalry general in the American Civil War
William Ross Ashby (1903–1972), English psychiatrist and founder of the English school of cybernetics

References 

English-language surnames